Mavillo Gheller (born 3 August 1975) is an Italian footballer.

Gheller spent his entire career in Italian lower division (form the second to the fifth division), especially in Prima Divisione (over 300 games).

Biography
Born in Busto Arsizio, the Province of Varese, Gheller started his career at hometown club Varese, followed the club promoted to Serie C2 in 1994 and Serie C1 in 1998.

In 2001, he left for Serie C2 team Pavia, winning the Group A of 2002–03 Serie C2. In 2004, he was signed by Serie B team Treviso. Despite the team losing the promotion playoffs of 2004–05 Serie B, the team promoted due to Caso Genoa in August. But Gheller already ruled out from Treviso provisional 2005–06 Serie B plan, and in June left for Serie C1 club Pistoiese.

In 2007, he was signed by fellow Serie C1 team Novara. He followed the team promoted successively promoted twice in 2010 and 2011, from Prima Divisione (ex- Serie C1) to Serie A. However, in its first and last Serie B season (and Novara also) he only made 10 starts. In the promotion playoffs the right backs were Michel Morganella and youngster Jean-Christophe Coubronne, which Gheller made his only appearance to replace the latter.

On 14 July 2011 his contract was mutually terminated in order to join A.C. Pavia. He was involved in 2011–12 Italian football scandal which FIGC alleged him has responsibility by failing to report organized match-fixing. on 30 August 2012 his contract was terminated.

On 22 October he was acquitted any charge in front of TNAS of CONI (Italian Olympic Committee).

Honours
Supercup
Supercoppa di Lega di Prima Divisione: 2010 (Novara)
League
Lega Pro Prima Divisione: 2010 (Novara)
Lega Pro Seconda Divisione: 1998 (Varese), 2003 (Pavia)
Serie D: 1994 (Varese)
CupCoppa Italia Lega Pro'': 1995 (Varese)

References

External links
 Football.it Profile 
 La Gazzetta dello Sport Profile 
 Lega Serie B Profile 
 

Italian footballers
Serie B players
S.S.D. Varese Calcio players
A.C. Monza players
Novara F.C. players
F.C. Pavia players
Treviso F.B.C. 1993 players
U.S. Pistoiese 1921 players
Association football fullbacks
People from Busto Arsizio
1975 births
Living people
Sportspeople from the Province of Varese
Footballers from Lombardy